Garv: Pride & Honour is a 2004 Indian Hindi-language action drama film directed by Puneet Issar. The film stars Salman Khan, Shilpa Shetty, Arbaaz Khan and Amrish Puri. Sunny Deol was the initial choice for Salman Khan's role, while Sanjay Dutt was considered for Arbaaz Khan's role. This film was Puneet Issar' s directional debut, dealing with Mumbai Underworld and politics in Maharashtra. The film was initially titled Sanghar.

Plot
Garv: Pride & Honour is a story of three brave and honest cops: Samar Singh (Amrish Puri), Arjun Ranawat (Salman Khan), and Hyder Ali Khan (Arbaaz Khan). The plot starts with court blaming Arjun for 18 killings at CM's Farmhouse. During 1984 riots, Arjun's parents were killed and then Shakuntla Devi (Farida Jalal) decided to adopt him. Samar wants to reduce the amount of crime in the state. The trio faces obstacles because the powerful and corrupt politicians including Kashinath Trivedi (Govind Namdev), Badrinath Trivedi (Anant Jog) and Yashwant Deshpanday (Shivaji Satam) are connected with underworld don Zafar Supari (Mukesh Rishi). The politicians decide to transfer Samar Singh while Arjun and Hyder kill Yeda (Zafar Supari's henchman) after they get into Arjun's house to warn Arjun's mother and sister by convincing Arjun to get not involved in Zafar Supari's criminal activities. Deshpande asks Kashinath Trivedi (Now Chief Minister of Maharashtra) to collect the file from Arjun he has made to prove that all of the corrupt politicians are involved with Zafar Supari. The next day, Arjun comes with the file and Kashi burns it, surprisingly Arjun tells him that one copy has been sent to Central Home Ministry, second copy to President's office and third copy has already been sent to the Prime Minister's Office. Furious Zafar lands in Mumbai, with trapping Hyder and his colleagues in Old Jassai Railway Yard. He brings RDX with Hyder successfully destroying it, but is killed by Zafar. While burying Hyder outside a mosque, Arjun receives a phone call from Zafar, unaware what he talked about. The present day starts at the court when Lawyer Tyagi (Anupam Kher) blames that Arjun's sister Rakhi (Akanksha Malhotra) was not at home on 1 November and was making merry with all corrupt politicians and their men at CM's Farmhouse. He further says that she even had illegitimate relations with her brother Arjun. Samar then decides to introduce Rakhi tomorrow in Court, but gets to know that Arjun's killings have had a deep, mental effect on Rakhi and that she is currently being treated at Saint Mary's sanitarium. He goes there and Rakhi tells him the truth of what happened on 1 November. In the court. at first Samar is reluctant to tell the truth, but surprisingly Rakhi herself comes and tells the truth. She tells that on the night of 1 November, she was kidnapped and gang-raped by them. The court later finds politicians wrong and release Arjun and he joins back his duty as an honest police officer.

Cast 
 Salman Khan as Arjun Ranawat, Assistant Commissioner of Police(A.C.P),an encounter specialist
 Shilpa Shetty as Jannat
 Arbaaz Khan as Hyder Ali Khan,A.C.P
 Akanksha Malhotra as Rakhi Dixit (Arjun's sister)
 Amrish Puri as Police Commissioner Samar Singh, who dreamt of Crime Free Mumbai, later transferred to Gadchiroli
 Farida Jalal as Arjun's mother
 Kulbhushan Kharbanda as Justice Acharya
 Anupam Kher as Tyagi (lawyer)
 Mukesh Rishi as underworld Don Zafar Supari, who runs the politics in Mumbai
 Mohan Joshi as Advocate Kulkarni
 Shivaji Satam as a corrupt Commissioner Yeshwant Deshpandey
 Vijayendra Ghatge as Chief Minister Satyanarayan Joshi
 Govind Namdeo as corrupt politician Kashinath Trivedi, who later becomes the Chief Minister of Maharashtra
 Rajpal Yadav as 555 (Informer)
 Anant Jog as Deputy Chief Minister Badrinath "Munna" Trivedi (younger brother of Kashinath Trivedi)
 Nimai Bali as Pappu Kaalia (Zafar Supari's Henchman)
 Hemant Birje as Zafar Supari's brother Majid Khan
 Reshma Bombaywala as cameo (Item number "Marhaba Marhaba")
 Deepak Jethi as Hakeem Lukka

Soundtrack
The movie contains music composed by Sajid–Wajid with one track composed by Anu Malik.

Box office
According to Box office India, Garv: Pride & Honour had a "Very Good opening" and collected during its opening weekend in India. By the end of its first week, the film collected  After three weeks, the film grossed  in India.

"I think Garv was ahead of its times. For Salman, the movie had set a benchmark in terms of action sequences, drama and emotion. If it would have been released today then it would have definitely done business of Rs 300 crore," -Puneet told PTI in an interview.

References

External links

2004 films
2004 action films
Indian action films
2000s Hindi-language films
Films scored by Sajid–Wajid
Films scored by Anu Malik
Hindi-language action films